Rauchvirus is a genus of viruses in the order Caudovirales, in the family Podoviridae. Bacteria serve as natural hosts. The genus contains only one species: Bordetella virus BPP1.

Structure
Viruses in Rauchvirus are non-enveloped, with icosahedral and head-tail geometries, and T=7 symmetry. The diameter is around 67 nm. Genomes are linear, around 42kb in length, and usually encodes about 50 proteins. The Bordetella phages of this genus contains an RNA-directed DNA polymerase which plays a role in tropism.

The genomes are linear, terminally redundant, and circularly with approximately 40. There are 53 proteins, and genes are arrayed in two transcriptional units, one on the negative strand, which is involved in regulation and recombination; the other is located on the positive strand which is involved in packaging, morphogenesis, lysis and integration.

Life cycle
Viral replication is cytoplasmic. Entry into the host cell is achieved by adsorption into the host cell. DNA-templated transcription is the method of transcription. Bacteria serve as the natural host. Transmission routes are passive diffusion.

References

External links
 Viralzone: Bppunalikevirus
 ICTV

Podoviridae
Virus genera